Thoroughbreds is a 1944 American drama film directed by George Blair, written by Wellyn Totman and Franklin Coen, and starring Tom Neal, Adele Mara, Roger Pryor, Paul Harvey, Eugene Gericke and Doodles Weaver. It was released on December 23, 1944, by Republic Pictures.

Plot

Sgt. Rusty Curtis of the U.S. Cavalry division is unhappy about the Army's plan to replace horses with tanks. After a medical discharge, Rusty tries to buy his old military mount, Sireson, but wealthy socialite Sally Crandall outbids him. Sally is the fiancée of Rusty's old barracks mate, Jack Martin.

Sally's father hires Rusty to train the horse for a big steeplechase race. A rivalry begins because Sally has a favorite horse of her own, but when hers is hurt, she and Rusty declare a truce and begin a romantic relationship.

Jack returns and overhears a conversation leading him to believe Rusty intends to lose the race on purpose. The two men fight after Jack insists on riding the horse in the race, but Jack's fears are overcome when Rusty superbly rides Sireson to victory.

Cast  
Tom Neal as Rusty Curtis
Adele Mara as Sally Crandall
Roger Pryor as Harold Matthews
Paul Harvey as John Crandall
Eugene Gericke as Jack Martin 
Doodles Weaver as Pvt. Mulrooney
Eddie Hall as Dapper
Tom London as Pop
Charles Sullivan as Nails
Alan Edwards as Maj. Lane
Sam Bernard as Pete
Buddy Gorman as Roberts

References

External links 
 

1944 films
American drama films
1944 drama films
Republic Pictures films
Films directed by George Blair
American black-and-white films
1940s English-language films
1940s American films